Wyler may refer to:

People
 Allen Wyler, neurosurgeon and author
 Bea Wyler (born 1951), second female rabbi in Germany
 Greg Wyler (born 1969), American tech entrepreneur, engineer, and inventor
 Gretchen Wyler (1932–2007), American actress
 Lia Wyler (1934–2018), Brazilian translator
 Maud Wyler (born 1982), French actress
 Rich Wyler, stage name of Richard Stapley
 Robert Wyler (1900–1971), American film producer
 William Wyler (1902–1981), film director

Places
 Wyler, North Rhine-Westphalia, a village along the Dutch/German border

Other
Wyler's, a brand name for soups and bouillon
Wyler, a character in the Art of Fighting series
Wyler Racing, a NASCAR Craftsman Truck Series team
Wyler (company), a Swiss watch manufacturer
 Wyler Aerial Tramway, an aerial tramway in El Paso, Texas, United States

See also 
 Weiler (disambiguation)